Noginskaya is a rural locality (a village) and the administrative center of Kolengskoye Rural Settlement, Verkhovazhsky District, Vologda Oblast, Russia. The population was 160 as of 2002. There are 3 streets.

Geography 
Noginskaya is located 51 km northeast of Verkhovazhye (the district's administrative centre) by road. Fominskaya is the nearest rural locality.

References 

Rural localities in Verkhovazhsky District